This is a list of female motor racing drivers who have taken part in the Formula One World Championship since the inception of the World Championship for Drivers in 1950.
 
Five women racing drivers have entered at least one Grand Prix, although only two of them ever qualified and started a race. The woman who competed in the most Grands Prix is Lella Lombardi, with 17 entries and 12 starts.

Desiré Wilson became the only woman to win a Formula One race of any kind when she won at Brands Hatch in the British Aurora F1 championship on 7 April 1980. As a result of this achievement, she has a grandstand at Brands Hatch named after her.

History 

The involvement of women in Formula One was pioneered by Italian Maria Teresa de Filippis who entered five races in the 1958 and 1959 seasons and started three scoring a best result of tenth position in the 1958 Belgian Grand Prix. In the following race in France, the race director denied her involvement, saying that "the only helmet that a woman should use is the hairdresser". Maria ended her career at the Monaco Grand Prix the following year.

Lombardi entered seventeen races and started twelve, having her best result in the 1975 Spanish Grand Prix where she finished sixth. With the race being stopped before three quarters of the scheduled race distance was completed, only half points were awarded. Lombardi became the first and so far only woman to score points in the World Championship.

In  the Briton Divina Galica tried to qualify for the British Grand Prix. This was the only Formula One Grand Prix in which multiple female racers (Lombardi and Galica) were entered, but both failed to qualify.

In , the South African Desiré Wilson tried to qualify for the British Grand Prix, not succeeding. In the same year she became the only woman to win a Formula One race of any kind when she won at Brands Hatch in the British Aurora F1 championship on 7 April 1980. As a result of this achievement, Wilson has a grandstand at Brands Hatch named after her.

The last woman to attempt to qualify for a Formula One Grand Prix was Italian Giovanna Amati in 1992. She tried to qualify for three races, but failed in all attempts. She was replaced by Damon Hill, who also failed to qualify the car in the 6 out of 8 following races he entered that season.

Drivers

Official drivers
Drivers listed in this table are those who have entered a Grand Prix. Actual starts are stated in brackets.

Test drivers and development drivers

Some female drivers have participated in non-competition testing and evaluation sessions with Formula One teams. IndyCar driver Sarah Fisher performed a demonstration run with McLaren after first practice for the 2002 United States Grand Prix. Katherine Legge tested with Minardi at the Vallelunga Circuit in 2005.

Other female drivers have been contracted to Formula One teams in testing and development capacities. In 2012, Williams signed Susie Wolff as a development and test driver. Two years later, Wolff became the first woman to take part in a Formula One race weekend in 22 years, when she participated in the first practice session at the British Grand Prix at Silverstone; the previous time being in 1992, when Giovanna Amati made three unsuccessful Grand Prix qualification attempts. María de Villota, the daughter of Spanish Formula One driver Emilio de Villota was hired as a test driver for Marussia until her crash in 2012 at the Duxford Aerodrome during a straightline test. De Villota died from her injuries the following year.  In 2014, Sauber signed IndyCar Series driver Simona de Silvestro as an "affiliated driver", with the goal of having her compete in 2015. In 2015 Lotus F1 signed Carmen Jordá to a deal including a run in a car.

Sauber signed Colombian driver Tatiana Calderón as development driver for 2017. Calderón was promoted from her development driver role to test driver for the 2018 season, and tested an F1 car for the first time with Sauber in Mexico in October 2018.

In 2019, Williams Driver Academy signed leading W Series contender Jamie Chadwick as a development driver for the Williams F1 team. Chadwick later won the 2019 W Series championship, the 2021 W Series championship and the 2022 W Series championship, and continues as a Williams development driver in 2022.

Milestones
First woman to compete in a Formula 1 race: Maria Teresa De Filippis (first race entered: 1958 Monaco Grand Prix, first race contested: 1958 Belgian Grand Prix)
First woman to score points: Lella Lombardi (1975 Spanish Grand Prix)
First race with more than one woman entered: 1976 British Grand Prix

See also 
List of female Indianapolis 500 drivers
List of female 24 Hours of Le Mans drivers
List of female NASCAR drivers
List of female racing drivers

References

Female drivers
Formula One drivers